CMS is an international law firm that offers legal and tax advisory services. It provides companies and organisations with advice on a full range of legal issues. CMS consists of 18 independent law firms with about 80 offices worldwide.

History 
In 1999, six European law firms with 1,400+ lawyers and roughly DM 500 million in joint revenues came together to form CMS. Under the CMS brand, which initially drew criticism, a "partnership of partnerships" emerged. The member law firms retained their established names. A central service unit was created to provide administrative and IT services for the members.

Initially, CMS included law firms from Germany, the Netherlands, Austria and the United Kingdom among others. Over the course of the 2000s, additional law firms joined from France, Italy, Monaco, Switzerland and Spain, along with other countries. In 2008, the law firm opened its first joint office in Russia. With the merger of CMS Cameron McKenna with Nabarro and Olswang in 2016, the law firm expanded once again. This resulted in CMS generating a total revenue of roughly one billion EUR for the first time. Today, there are also CMS offices in Latin America and Africa.

Russia 
Carter-Ruck was involved in legal action against Financial Times journalist Catherine Belton and her publisher HarperCollins over her book Putin’s People.

In April 2022, CMS law firm was named alongside Harbour Litigation Funding by Kevin Hollinrake MP, in a letter to the Chancellor of the Exchequer Rishi Sunak MP, as two professional services firms acting for the benefit of Russian state entities during the invasion of Ukraine. The letter highlighted that both Harbour and CMS are working on behalf of the Russian state-owned DIA to bypass sanction regimes and obtain funds and assets from abroad in order to fund the war in Ukraine.

CMS was named by U.S. congressman Steve Cohen as doing "unscrupulous" work for Russia that undermined democratic values and strengthened the Vladimir Putin regime in Russia. CMS rejected allegations of impropriety and said the firm had not accepted new instructions from individuals associated with the Putin regime.

Structure 
CMS coordinates the activities of its members through CMS Legal Services EEIG, a european economic interest grouping. In its early phase, it handled administrative tasks, gradually taking on additional duties, e.g. in marketing. CMS Legal Services does not act on behalf of clients. As a not for profit entity, it is financed by means of revenue contributions from the participating law firms, which remain legally independent.

The CMS Council functions as the highest decision-making body of CMS. It convenes at least twice a year, taking decisions on budgets and the acceptance of new members. Moreover, there is an Executive Committee, which handles strategic issues such as the appointment and governance of the executive team. Each participating law firm appoints representatives to the Committee.

The daily running of CMS is in the hands of a three-person executive team. It consists of Pierre-Sébastien Thill (Chairman), Duncan Weston (Executive Partner) and Isabel Scholes (Executive Director).

Locations 
Currently, CMS has 18 member firms with main headquarters in twelve European, four South American and two African countries. In addition to legal services provided in their home countries, the member law firms are active in other countries via branches, subsidiaries and associated law firms, along with offices and representative offices in other countries.

 Members
 CMS Albiñana & Suárez de Lezo, Spain
 CMS Adonnino Ascoli & Cavasola Scamoni, Italy
 CMS Cameron McKenna Nabarro Olswang, United Kingdom
 CMS Carey & Allende, Chile
 CMS Daly Inamdar, Kenya
 CMS DeBacker, Belgium
 CMS Derks Star Busmann, Netherlands
 CMS Francis Lefebvre, France
 CMS Grau, Peru
 CMS Hasche Sigle, Germany
 CMS Kluge, Norway
 CMS Pasquier Ciulla Marquet & Pastor, Monaco
 CMS Reich-Rohrwig Hainz, Austria
 CMS RM Partners, South Africa
 CMS Rodríguez-Azuero, Colombia
 CMS Rui Pena & Arnaut, Portugal
 CMS von Erlach Partners, Switzerland
 CMS Woodhouse Lorente Ludlow, Mexico

Services 
CMS pursues a full-service strategy, and offers companies of various sizes worldwide business-focused advice in law and tax matters. The key specialist areas include corporate law, capital markets law, tax law, energy law, procurement law, competition law and labour law.

See also 
 List of 100 largest law firms globally
 List of largest European law firms

References

External links 

  
 Firms of the Year 2019

Law firms established in 1999
Law firms of Germany
Intellectual property law firms
Patent law firms